The curlew sandpiper (Calidris ferruginea) is a small wader that breeds on the tundra of Arctic Siberia.

It is strongly migratory, wintering mainly in Africa, but also in south and southeast Asia and in Australia and New Zealand. It is a vagrant to North America.

Taxonomy
The curlew sandpiper was formally described in 1763 by the Danish author Erik Pontoppidan under the binomial name Tringa ferrugineus. It is now placed with 23 other sandpipers in the genus Calidris that was introduced in 1804 by the German naturalist Blasius Merrem. The genus name is from Ancient Greek kalidris or skalidris, a term used by Aristotle for some grey-coloured waterside birds. The specific ferruginea is from Latin ferrugo, ferruginis, "iron rust" referring to its colour in breeding plumage. The curlew sandpiper is treated as monotypic: no subspecies are recognised. Within the genus Calidris the curlew sandpiper is most closely related to the stilt sandpiper (Calidris himantopus).

This species occasionally hybridizes with the sharp-tailed sandpiper and the pectoral sandpiper, producing the presumed "species" called "Cooper's sandpiper" ("Calidris" × cooperi) and "Cox's sandpiper" ("Calidris" × paramelanotos), respectively.

Description

These birds are small waders, similar to dunlins, but differ in having a longer down-curved beak, longer neck and legs and a white rump. The breeding adult has patterned dark grey upperparts and brick-red underparts. In winter, this bird is pale grey above and white below, and shows an obvious white supercilium. Juveniles have a grey and brown back, a white belly and a peach-coloured breast.

Distribution and habitat
The curlew sandpiper breeds in the Siberian Arctic from the Yamal Peninsula to the Kolyuchin Bay.

Behaviour
This wader is highly gregarious, and will form flocks with other calidrid waders, particularly dunlin. Despite its easterly breeding range, this species is regular on passage in western Europe, presumably because of southwesterly migration route.

Breeding
The breeding grounds are occupied from June till late August. The male curlew sandpiper performs an aerial display during courtship. The nesting site is at the edge of a marsh or pool, or on dry patches of tundra. The average clutch size is 3.8 eggs which are laid at daily intervals. The eggs are incubated by the female and hatch after 19–20 days. The chicks are cared for by the female for 14–16 days.

The reproductive success of this species appears to be dependent on the population of lemmings (West Siberian lemmings (Lemmus sibiricus), East Siberian lemmings (Lemmus paulus) and the Arctic lemming (Dicrostonyx torquatus). In poor lemming years, predatory species such as the Arctic fox (Alopes lagopus) will take Arctic-breeding waders instead.

Food and feeding
It forages in soft mud on marshes and the coast, mainly picking up food by sight. It mostly eats insects and other small invertebrates.

Status
Counts of the curlew sandpipe in South Africa, specifically at Langebaan Lagoon where they are most numerous, indicate a 40% decline in numbers between 1975 and 2009. A similar trend has been noted in Australia and may be linked to effects of global warming at the breeding grounds. It has an extremely large range but although the population is large it is very hard to determine and appears to be decreasing,. The International Union for Conservation of Nature (IUCN) has judged the species to be "Near-threatened". The curlew sandpiper is one of the species to which the Agreement on the Conservation of African-Eurasian Migratory Waterbirds (AEWA) applies.

References

Sources

External links

 Curlew sandpiper species text in The Atlas of Southern African Birds 
 Pictures of curlew sandpiper at Birdlife Finland 
 Identification article on autumn curlew sandpipers
 Ageing and sexing (PDF; 1.4 MB) by Javier Blasco-Zumeta & Gerd-Michael Heinze
 
 
 
 
 
 
 
 

curlew sandpiper
curlew sandpiper
curlew sandpiper
Birds of North Asia
Near threatened animals
Near threatened biota of Asia
Near threatened biota of Australia
curlew sandpiper
Articles containing video clips
Taxa named by Erik Pontoppidan